The Israel Nature and Parks Authority ( Rashut Hateva Vehaganim) is an Israeli government organization that manages nature reserves and national parks in Israel, the Golan Heights and parts of the West Bank. The organization was founded in April 1998, merging two organizations (The National Parks Authority and the Nature Reserves Authority) that had managed the nature reserves and national parks separately since 1964. The director of the Authority is Raya Shurki. 

The symbol of the Israel Nature and Parks Authority is the ibex, a mountain goat similar to the antelope. One of the missions of the Israel Nature and Parks Authority is enforcing Israeli wildlife protection laws.

Regions 

As of 2015, the Israel Nature and Parks Authority was the overseer of 400 nature reserves and 81 national parks, covering over 20 percent of Israel’s land mass. The coverage of the Authority has grown  fairly rapidly. For example, in 2007 the Authority oversaw only 69 national parks and 190 nature reserves - a doubling of reserves in only 8 years.

All parks and nature reserves are divided into six regions:
 Golan Heights, Sea of Galilee, and Galilee
 Lower Galilee and their valleys
 Mount Carmel, the coast, and central Israel
 Judean Desert and The Dead Sea
 The Negev
 Eliat and the Arava

Criticism
The Society for the Protection of Nature in Israel has criticized decisions be the Nature and Parks Authority's policies on several occasions, claiming that they have harmed nature reserves in various ways. Let the Animals Live has also claimed that the Authority was harming animals.

In 2007, scientists and nature conservation organizations opposed the extension of CEO Eli Amitay's appointment for a second term, citing claims regarding the Authority's conservation policies during his first term, but the government approved the appointment nonetheless. In 2011, Minister of Environmental Protection Gilad Erdan sought to depose Amitay, claiming that he is acting against public interest. As a result, Amitay retired a year earlier than planned. In December of the same year, Shaul Goldstein, head of the Gush Etzion Regional Council was appointed as CEO by a government committee.

In October 2017, the Authority came under public criticism when a visitor to Avshalom Cave observed that none of the instructional material in the cave contained an estimate of its age, and a local guide claimed that this was due to pressure by the ultra-Orthodox population, which was later confirmed by media outlets. After the affair, the authority announced that the material will be corrected and the CEO "called for an examination of all instructional material to ensure that it conforms to scientific truth".

Heads of Nature Reserves Authority 
, 1964-1965
Avraham Yoffe, 1965-1978
Adir Shapira, 1973-1981
, 1982-1990
Dan Perry, 1990-1995
, 1995-1997

Heads of National Parks Authority 

 Yaakov Yanai, 1964-1978
 Zvi Barzel, 1978-1984
 Mordechai Ben-Porat, 1984-1994
 Israel Gilad, 1994-1997

See also 
 List of national parks and nature reserves of Israel
 Tourism in Israel

References

External links 
 Israel Nature & Parks Authority website
 Israel Nature & Parks Authority website 
 Israel Nature & Parks Authority website 

Nature and Parks Authority
 
 
1998 establishments in Israel
National park administrators